A hotfix or quick-fix engineering update (QFE update) is a single, cumulative package that includes information (often in the form of one or more files) that is used to address a problem in a software product (i.e., a software bug). Typically, hotfixes are made to address a specific customer situation.

The term "hotfix" originally referred to software patches that were applied to "hot" systems: those which are live, currently running, and in production status rather than development status. For the developer, a hotfix implies that the change may have been made quickly and outside normal development and testing processes. This could increase the cost of the fix by requiring rapid development, overtime or other urgent measures. For the user, the hotfix could be considered riskier or less likely to resolve the problem. This could cause an immediate loss of services, so depending on the severity of the bug, it may be desirable to delay a hotfix. The risk of applying the hotfix must be weighed against the risk of not applying it, because the problem to be fixed might be so critical that it could be considered more important than a potential loss of service (e.g., a major security breach).

Similar use of the terms can be seen in hot-swappable disk drives. The more recent usage of the term is likely due to software vendors making a distinction between a hotfix and a patch.

Details 
A hotfix package might contain several "encompassed" bug fixes, raising the risk of possible regression. An encompassed bug fix is a software bug fix that is not the main objective of a software patch, but rather the side effect of it. Because of this, some libraries for automatic updates like StableUpdate also offer features to uninstall the applied fixes if necessary.

Most modern operating systems and many stand-alone programs offer the capability to download and apply fixes automatically. Instead of creating this feature from scratch, the developer may choose to use a proprietary (like RTPatch) or open-source (like StableUpdate and JUpdater) package that provides the needed libraries and tools.

There are also a number of third-party software programs to aid in the installation of hotfixes to multiple machines at the same time.  These software products also help the administrator by creating a list of hotfixes already installed on multiple machines.

Vendor-specific definition

Microsoft
Microsoft Corporation once used the terms "hotfix" or "QFE"  but has stopped in favor of new terminology: updates are either delivered in the General Distribution Release (GDR) channel or the Limited Distribution Release (LDR) channel. The latter is synonymous with QFE. GDR updates receive extensive testing whereas LDR updates are meant to fix a certain problem in a small area and are not released to the general public. GDR updates may be received from the Windows Update service or the Microsoft Download Center but LDR updates must be received via Microsoft Support.

Blizzard
The game company Blizzard Entertainment has a different use of the term hotfix for their games, including World of Warcraft and Diablo III:
A hotfix is a change made to the game deemed critical enough that it cannot be held off until a regular content patch. Hotfixes require only a server-side change with no download and can be implemented with no downtime, or a short restart of the realms.

See also
Patch (computing)
Service pack

References

Debugging
Software release
Software maintenance
System administration